Dichomeris oxycarpa is a moth in the family Gelechiidae. It was described by Edward Meyrick in 1935. It is found in China (Hong Kong, Hainan) and Taiwan.

The wingspan is 17–19 mm. The forewings are usually greyish green, but range from dark to pale greenish. There is a costal blotch at the middle with a somewhat rounded posterior margin.

References

Moths described in 1935
oxycarpa